Kamenny is a rural locality (a village) in Niginskoye Rural Settlement, Nikolsky District, Vologda Oblast, Russia. The population was 21 as of 2002.

Geography 
The distance to Nikolsk is 30 km, to Nigino is 12 km. Pyatakov is the nearest rural locality.

References 

Rural localities in Nikolsky District, Vologda Oblast